Mahmudabad (also Romanized as Maḩmūdābād; also known as Muhammadābād, and Qozīcheh Qozīchī) is a village in Mehraban-e Sofla Rural District, Gol Tappeh District, Kabudarahang County, Hamadan Province, Iran. At the 2006 census, its population was 130, in 20 families.

References 

Populated places in Kabudarahang County